Patongo is a town in Agago District, Acholi sub-region in the Northern Region of Uganda. The town is administered by Patongo Town Council

Location
The coordinates of the town are 2°45'36.0"N, 33°18'36.0"E (Latitude:2.7600; Longitude:33.3100).

Overview
The town of Patongo was formed during the 2000s along with Pader and Pader District. Initially the location of a large camp for internally displaced people as a result of the Lord's Resistance Army insurgency, Patongo was granted town council  status by the Ugandan parliament effective July 2010. In 2010, when Pader District was divided to create Agago District, Patongo went with Agago District.

Points of interest

The following additional points of interest are located within or near the town of Patongo:

 Patongo central market
 Kilak-Moroto road, going through the middle of town
 offices of Paorinher Orphanage, a non-governmental organization
 Gwoke Keni, an HIV/AIDS support group that hosts its own RootIO radio station on 103.8FM.

See also
 List of cities and towns in Uganda

References

External links
Myths And Facts About Northern Uganda - 21 April 2006
Africa After War: Paths to Forgiveness – Ugandans Welcome 'Terrorists' Back - 23 October 2006

Agago District
Populated places in Northern Region, Uganda
Cities in the Great Rift Valley